The Town of Branch is an incorporated community on the Cape Shore of Newfoundland and Labrador, Canada and had a population of 177 (as of the 2021 census).

Geography
It is located on St. Mary's Bay and can be accessed via Route 100 or Route 92.  Nearby communities include Point Lance and St. Bride's, Newfoundland and Labrador.

History

The first settler was Thomas Nash, a fisherman and boat builder from Callan in County Kilkenny, Ireland, who in 1765 arrived in Caplin Bay (Calvert) on the Southern Shore. During the winter, they weren't allowed to get ready for the fishery as year round settlement was discouraged by the British. They had nothing to do, so Nash and his sons, decided they'd build a boat. They didn't have material enough to finish the boat, sail 'er, so when the spring came, they covered her with boughs.

The first fishing admiral that came in, he was the boss in the settlement for that year. He found the boat. Nash had to hide in the woods to avoid being caught. He was first arrested, but eventually rewarded for his skill in adapting to his new homeland."We had nothing to do during the winter so we decided to build the boat." Nash told the admiral. So the admiral said to him, "I know you're not allowed. But,"I think, you're the kind of person that should get to settle out here, industrious." So "Write down what you need to finish your boat and if it's aboard this vessel you can have it."

The skipper gave him whatever he had aboard was necessary to finish the boat. And he said, "When I go back to England, I'll report it and I might get something done for you." So when he went back to England he brought back Nash a grant of all the shoreline of Calvert. The next year Nash got the boat going and he left Calvert to go fishing up at Cape St. Mary's, up around St. Mary's Bay. They put into Branch one time and the salmon were so plentiful, that he thought that this would be a better place to fish.

During the fall of 1787. Nash was described as "an old planter" of the community. Voter lists indicate that Thomas and Tobias Nash lived in the section of Calvert known today as the Point. Oral tradition indicates that the Nashes left Calvert for Branch. He first moved to Mosquito Island in Placentia Bay in 1789 after a relative, Rev Pat Power ran afoul of Bishop O'Donnell and arrived the next year in Branch, along with an English friend. Thomas had five sons, Walter, Tom, Andy, Toby, and Paddy, and two daughters, Nora and Nellie. His two brothers Toby and Walter, joined him in Branch in 1795.

Demographics 

References
 Letter Book of the Colonial Secretary's Office, vol. 3, 1759–65, P- 352, V0l- 5, 1771–74, P. 180, PANL; Newfoundland Sessions Court Records, Ferryland, 1789–94, case of Sept. 15, 1770, and case of Sept. 20, 1790, PANL; Cyril J. Byrne, ed., Gentlemen-Bishops and Faction Fighters: The Letters of Bishops O'Donel, Lambert, Scallan and Other Irish Missionaries (St. John's: Jesperson Press, 1984), pp. 62–64, 90-91; John J. Mannion, card files.
A Place to Belong – Community Order and Everyday Space in Calvert, Newfoundland, Gerard Pocius.
Irish Settlements in Eastern Canada, John J. Manion.

External links

Towns in Newfoundland and Labrador